Lamorick is a hamlet in Cornwall, England. It is half a mile north of Lanivet {where the population for the 2011 census was included.} on the A30 main road.

References

Hamlets in Cornwall